Juan Luna Building (also known as the Juan Luna Plaza) is a historic building located in Binondo, Manila, Philippines. It was also known as the Pacific Commercial Company Building, First National City Bank Building, and the Ayala Building.

History

The Juan Luna Building was built as the Pacific Commercial Company Building in the 1920s. The construction of the building was finished by July 1922 and was inaugurated November 13, 1922. The building was later bought by Enrique Zobel and was known as the "Ayala Building" from 1940 to 1959. The LBC Properties Inc. led a renovation of the building in 2007. The First National City Bank also occupied the building.

In 2009, the building was bought by businessman Carlos Araneta who planned to the building to host a business process outsourcing company. The building underwent renovation in 2012 and was meant to be named as the Juan Luna e-Services Building. The facade of the building was preserved However lack of investors hindered Araneta's plan and the Juan Luna Building was purposed as a mixed-used building that also serves as a living museum

2018 fire
Past midnight of May 28, 2018, a fire broke out at the nearby Land Management Bureau Building. By 8:00 AM (PST +8:00), the fire has reached the Juan Luna Building. The third floor and portions of the fourth floor of the Juan Luna Building were affected by the fire. The 150 Plaza Cervantes building and the Moraga Mansion were also affected by the fire which was put out around 4:00 PM The incident is suspected to be caused by arson due to the timing of the start of the fire.

The National Archives of the Philippines office hosted in the Juan Luna Building was affected by the fire although the agency stated that no historical documents were burnt since it keeps these in their offices in Paco and Ermita.

Architecture and design
The five-storey Juan Luna Building was designed by American architects Murphy, McGill and Hamlin of New York City and Shanghai, and was completed at a cost of two million pesos.

The building derived its design from the trademark architectural features set by the International Banking Corporation of New York for its overseas branches. The bank's prototype was made up of a row of colossal columns in antis, which was faithfully reproduced for its Manila headquarters. The ground floor was fully rusticated to effect a textured finish. This floor had arched openings with fanlights emphasized by stones forming the arch. The main doors were adorned with lintels resting on consoles. Above the ground floor were six three-storey high, engaged Ionic columns, ending in an entablature topped by a cornice. These six columns dominating the south and west facades were, in turn, flanked by a pair of pilasters on both fronts. The fifth floor was slightly indented and also topped by an entablature crowned by strip of anthemion.

References 

Buildings and structures in Binondo
Commercial buildings completed in 1922
Office buildings in Metro Manila
20th-century architecture in the Philippines